The Speiser Shale or Speiser Formation is a geologic formation in Kansas, Oklahoma, and Nebraska dating to the early Permian period.

See also

 List of fossiliferous stratigraphic units in Kansas
 Paleontology in Kansas

References

Permian Kansas